These are the Canadian number-one country albums of 1992, per the RPM Country Albums chart.

1992
1992 record charts
1992 in Canadian music